The Ngathokudi (Ngadhugudi) were an indigenous Australian people of the state of Queensland. Their language was possibly a dialect of Uradhi.

Country

Alternative names
 (Ng)uthukuti.
 Athokurra.

Notes

Citations

Sources

Aboriginal peoples of Queensland